A statue of the Empress Joséphine was installed in Fort-de-France, Martinique, from 1859 until 2020. It commemorated Empress Joséphine (the first wife of Napoleon), who was born on Martinique, and was commissioned by her grandson Napoleon III from the sculptor . In 2020 it was destroyed by activists during the George Floyd protests.

History
On 21 September 1991 the statue was decapitated; its head was never found. On 26 July 2020 the statue was torn down by "anti-racism protesters". This was condemned by public officials; however, a police source told the press that they had received orders not to interfere with the protesters. Around the same time the protesters also destroyed a nearby statue of Pierre Belain d'Esnambuc, erected in 1935, and several months prior, in April, they destroyed two statues of Victor Schœlcher, claiming that the authorities should honour black emancipation leaders instead of the colonial heritage.

See also

References

External links
 

1859 establishments in France
1859 sculptures
Destroyed sculptures
Monuments and memorials in France
Outdoor sculptures
Statues removed in 2020
Sculptures of women
Statues in France
Vandalized works of art